Arniel is a surname. Notable people with the name include:

 Annie Arniel (1873–1924), American suffragist and women's rights advocate
 Jamie Arniel (born 1989), Canadian ice hockey player
 Scott Arniel (born 1962), Canadian ice hockey player and coach